In civil law, obrogation (Latin: obrogat from obrogare) is the modification or repeal of a law in whole or in part by issuing a new law.

In canon law, of the Catholic Church, obrogation is the enacting of a contrary law that is a revocation of a previous law; it may also be the partial cancellation or amendment of a law, decree, or legal regulation by the imposition of a newer one.

Catholic Church
The 1983 Code of Canon Law governs here in canon 53:

This canon incorporates Rule 34 in VI of the Regulae Iuris: "Generi per speciem derogatur" or "The specific derogates from the general."

See also
Repeal
Conflict of laws
Implied repeal
Naskh (tafsir)

References

Bibliography

Coriden, James A., Thomas J. Green, Donald E. Heintschel (editors). The Code of Canon Law: A Text and Commentary (New York: Paulist Press, 1985). Commissioned by the Canon Law Society of America.
Della Rocca, Fernando. Manual of Canon Law (Milwaukee: The Bruce Publishing Company, 1959) translated by Rev. Anselm Thatcher, O.S.B.

Jurisprudence of Catholic canon law
Civil law legal terminology
Catholic Church legal terminology